This article lists the achievements of the New Zealand Warriors (formerly Auckland Warriors) in the competitions they have competed in since 1995.

These lists encompass records from the:
 Australian Rugby League competition, 1995–1996.
 Super League competitions, 1997.
 National Rugby League competition, 1998–present.

Premierships

The Warriors have never won a Grand Final.

Runners-up

Minor Premierships

Finals Appearances
National Rugby League: 2001, 2002, 2003, 2007, 2008, 2010, 2011, 2018
In addition the Warriors made the semi finals of the World Club Challenge in 1997.

References

Honours
Rugby league trophies and awards
National Rugby League lists
New Zealand rugby league lists